The Technical University of Madrid or sometimes called Polytechnic University of Madrid (UPM) is a public university, located in Madrid, Spain. It was founded in 1971 as the result of merging different Technical Schools of Engineering and Architecture, originating mainly in the 18th century. Over 35,000 students attend classes during the year.

According to the annual university ranking conducted by El Mundo, the Technical University of Madrid ranks as the top technical university in Spain, and second overall. The majority of its Engineering Schools are consistently ranked as leading academic institutions in Spain in their fields, and among the very best in Europe.

The UPM is part of the TIME network, which groups fifty engineering schools throughout Europe.

History

The Technical University of Madrid (UPM) was founded in 1971, although the majority of its Centres are over hundreds of years old and were founded in the 18th and 19th centuries. Each of them maintained their independence until being grouped together to form the UPM in 1971. It is no exaggeration to state that for over one and a half centuries great part of the history of Spanish technology has been written by the Schools of Architecture and Engineering of the UPM. They have been during a lot of years nearly the only and in some cases actually the only school. All of the important personalities in the area of teaching and research passed through their respective centres as students or lecturers.

One of the oldest records of technological studies in Spain is the Royal Academy of Mathematics in Madrid, leaving aside the Quatrivium of arithmetics, geometry, astronomy and music, the four liberal arts, that form the base of the technical disciplines, which were studied in the monastic and cathedral schools and later in the medieval and renaissance universities. The Royal Academy of Mathematics was created after the idea and personal initiative of King Philip II after his return from a visit to Portugal in 1582, where he realised that the Portuguese cartographers were more advanced than those in Spain. The Academy did not award qualifications that entitled to exercise a profession. Its prestige was based on the lecturers and subjects taught. Cartographers, pilots, architects and engineers were trained in a way that the latter two started to gain a certain degree of recognition. In 1643 the Academy was closed down. The second relevant record of technological studies was the Corps of Army, Cities, Ports and Frontiers Engineers founded by King Philip V in 1711. This date marked the foundation of the Spanish engineers as an organised profession. In 1716, for their training, the Royal Military School of Mathematics in Barcelona was created, even if it was not opened until 1720 and besides was limited to a strictly military context.

Architecture
Among all the subjects that nowadays form part of the Technical University of Madrid, the first to start specific and concrete lectures and not in a generalised manner, as it was the case of engineering that started with a military background, was architecture, years before the School and the Academy of Fine Arts were created. The Foundation Assembly of the Royal Academy of the Three Noble Arts of Saint Ferdinand was held on 18.07.1744 in the home of G.D. Olivieri, first sculptor to the king since 1741 where he had a private academy and its studies prepared the way for the ones that were officially regulated in the assembly. Twelve lecturers, four for each subject where appointed. The classes of the new School that depended on the Academy of Fine Arts started in the Casa de la Panadería in the Plaza Mayor of Madrid and continued there until 1773 when the Academy moved to its present building.

Although the Special School of Fine Arts was founded in 1845 as an independent entity, it was at the beginning under the inspection and monitoring of the Academy. At present the Higher Technical School of Architecture is located in a modern building in the Ciudad Universitaria in Madrid.

School of Naval Architecture
King Charles III ordered on 13.08.1772 the foundation of the School of Naval Architecture for the training of the future members of the Corps of Naval Architects (24.12.1770). The academy was opened in El Ferrol. After several years of teaching a series of difficulties led to the closure of the centre. French naval architects were taken on after intense negotiations and the centre was reopened in the Arsenal de la Carraca in Cadiz in 1848. Today's School of Naval Architects, located in the Ciudad Universitaria, is one out of two UPM schools that started with a military background and is completely civilian nowadays. Several years later the same happened in the School of Aeronautics.

School of Mining Engineering

The School of Mining Engineering was the first that from the day of its foundation had a civil character. It was established in 1777 by the orders of King Charles III of Spain in Almadén, Ciudad Real, where already some type of informal teaching existed, in order to make use of a very important element: the mercury mines. Mercury was in those days an irreplaceable material for the amalgamation of silver, which was one of the key sources of wealth in Latin America, especially in Mexico. This school started its activities in a similar historical context to that of other centres such as those in Saxony (Freiberg 1767), Hungary (Schmnitz 1770) and France (Paris 1778).

The center was transferred to the Mexican viceroyalty, and it remained there until the end of the Mexican Independence War from Spain. It was then transferred to Madrid where the Interior Minister, Martín de los Heros, inaugurated the premises on 7.01.1835.
A new building for the School of Mining Engineering of Madrid was inaugurated in the 1890s.

School of Civil Engineering
At the beginning of the 19th century, in 1802, the School of Civil Engineering, considered the best one in Spain, was founded at the initiative of Augustin de Bethencourt, an outstanding representative of the eloquent restless and inquiring spirit of the Spanish Enlightenment. It was located in the Palacio del Buen Retiro in Madrid until May 1808.

At the beginning of the academic year 1889-90, students and professors continued their activity in the new building in Alfonso XII Street, where the School remained until it moved to its current location in the Ciudad Universitaria in Madrid.

This school has been classified by El Mundo as the best Civil Engineering School in Spain, and its six-year degree has been certified by the Accreditation Board for Engineering and Technology (ABET).

School of Forestry Engineering
A Royal Decree created the Special School of Forestry Engineering in 1835, although it did not start its activity until 1848 in Villaviciosa de Odón, Madrid. The first graduates of the School of Villaviciosa created the Corps of Forestry Engineers. Its current premises are in the Ciudad Universitaria in Madrid.

School of Industrial Engineering
The industrial engineers' lectures descend from the Patriotic Seminar of Vergara and the activities of the Economic Associations of Friends of the Country. José I in Madrid opened the Arts Conservatory, an imitation of the one in Paris, in 1809. The Royal Decree (18.08.1842) reopened it with the same name but within a short period of time it was again shut down. The Minister of Trade, Seijas Lozano, signed a Royal Decree (4.10.1850) in order to create the Royal Industrial Institute and the degree in Industrial Engineering.

School of Agricultural, Food and Biosystems Engineering
The Minister of Public Works, Manuel Alonso Martínez, founded the Central Agriculture School on 1 October 1855. At first it was set up on the "La Flamenca" estate on the Royal Property in Aranjuez. It was closed on 3 November 1868 and by another Decree (28.01.1869) immediately moved to Madrid. Ratified by several legal norms, it was given the so-called "La Florida" or "La Moncloa" property, the present University Campus of Madrid, as well as other nearby land. The new building of the Agricultural Institute of Alfonso XII was constructed on the property. Later it was called National Agronomy Institute and today Higher Technical School of Agricultural Engineering of Madrid. Among other studies, it hosts the Bachelor's Degree in Biotechnology, which has the highest admission grade requirement of the whole university (12.914/14).

School of Telecommunication Engineering (Electrical and Computer Engineering)
The General School of Telegraphy was the first of the three Higher Schools to be created in the 20th century. It was founded by a Decree (3.06.1913) with three sections and another Decree (22.04.1920) created the qualification of Telecommunication Engineer. From 1912 to 1935 it was located in a building on Paseo de Recoletos in Madrid, until 1936 on Ferraz Street, then on Conde de Peñalver Street until it was finally transferred to the Ciudad Universitaria in Madrid.
It is one of the best reputed telecommunication schools in Spain. In fact, their telecommunications degree has been an ABET accredited program since 2008.

School of Aeronautical Engineering
In 1926 and 1928 the qualification of Aeronautical Engineer and the Higher School of Aeronautical Engineering, located near the airfield of Cuatro Vientos in Madrid, were created almost simultaneously. The Military Academy of Aeronautical Engineering was set up by a Decree (15.10.1939) and by another recovered its civilian character. The Technical Education Organisation Law (20.07.1957) provided it with its current name of Higher Technical School of Aeronautical Engineering. It was established in a modern building in the Ciudad Universitaria in Madrid. Currently with the Bologna plan the degree taught is Aerospace Engineering. The school of engineering is now called ETSIAE (Escuela Técnica Superior de Ingenieros Aeronáuticos y del Espacio) and is the best institution in Spain to carry out aeronautical studies. Additionally, it is known for being one of the most difficult programs in the Spanish educational system.

School of Computer Sciences Engineering and Mathematics 
The newest of the centres is the School of Computer Sciences. Madrid's Institute of Computer Sciences was created in 1969 outside the university framework until the studies in 1976 became part of the University and simultaneously the School of Computer Sciences was set up. From the first day of lectures in October 1977, it was integrated into the UPM. Since 1988 it has been located on the campus of Montegancedo.

The School of Computer Sciences offers the first Spanish undergraduate degree in Mathematics and Computer Sciences. The program condenses studies of mathematics and computer sciences into one degree, placing special emphasis on the mathematical foundations of computer science and computer-based tools for mathematics. It combines mathematics and informatics subjects, focusing on fields where the two are most relevant to each other and stressing the interrelationships between the two disciplines to shape a degree course that is being successfully taught at leading world universities such as Massachusetts Institute of Technology (MIT) in the US, the University of Oxford in the UK or Université Pierre et Marie Curie in France.

School of Physical Activity and Sport Sciences (INEF)
Since 14 September 1998 the Faculty of Physical Activity and Sport Sciences (INEF) was an affiliated centre and on 1 October 2003 was integrated to our University.

Technical Assistants Engineering schools
The University Schools of Technical Engineering were mainly set up at the same time as the Higher Technical Schools to provide training for Assistants or Technicians. However, these names gradually disappeared and gave way to the present names and qualifications.

Education

Traditionally, in Spain there were two levels of technical studies. For engineering studies there was a 3-year degree called  (Technical Engineer, roughly equivalent to a BSc) with all powers and legal authority in their field and a 5- or 6-year degree called  (Engineer, roughly equivalent to a MSc). In the case of architecture studies there was a 3-year degree called  (Technical Architect) and a 5-year degree called  (Senior Architect). Those degrees disappeared as a result of the Bologna process and the new structure features 4-year BSc degrees and 1- or 2-year MSc degrees maintaining the same professional and legal responsibilities that previously called technical engineers with master's degrees on top. Technical University of Madrid access grades rank as the highest in their fields every year.

Campuses
UPM's Schools are spread all over Madrid, instead of being placed in a unified campus. They are:

University City (Ciudad Universitaria) or Moncloa Campus
Montegancedo Campus
South Campus (Vallecas's Politechnical Complex)
Downtown Campus (Schools inside Madrid's historical center)

Research
The Scientific and Technological Park of the UPM (“Parque UPM”) represents a significant boost to the University's R&D&i activity through the creation of new R&D&i centres, business incubators, and specialized laboratories, with the backing and participation of public and private institutions.

The concept of “Parque UPM” covers various scientific and technological areas linked with engineering and architecture. It is geographically distributed in various sites, all of which are located in the region of Madrid (Comunidad Autónoma de Madrid): South Campus, Montegancedo and Getafe.

University Institutes and Centers:
Solar Power Institute
Institute of Automobile Research (INSIA), with hybrid electric vehicle research.
Microgravity Institute Ignacio da Riva
Spanish User Support and Operations Centre (E-USOC)
Institute of Optoelectronics and Microtechnology Systems (ISOM)
Supercomputing and Visualization Center of Madrid (CeSViMa)
Center for the Transport Research (TRANSYT)
Center for Biomedical Technology
Laser Center
Institute of Solar Energy
Institute for Nuclear Fusion
Institute for Automobile Research
Institute for Microgravity
Institute for Optoelectronic Systems and Microtechnology
Integral Domotic Center (CeDInt).

International

UPM Double Degrees

The UPM has signed 87 specific double degree agreements with centres of excellence at a number of worldwide Universities.

A double degree gives the best students the opportunity to study for an international degree by combining studies in two types of engineering, at the same time as it prepares them better for their future career. On completing their studies, students will simultaneously obtain a degree from the UPM in addition to a degree from the foreign university they have attended.

A list of the Universities that have double degree programs with the UPM is shown above.

France
 Arts et Métiers ParisTech (ENSAM)
 École Centrale de Lille
 École Centrale de Lyon
 École Centrale de Marseille
 École Centrale de Nantes
 École Centrale Paris (ECP)
 École des Hautes Études Commerciales (HEC)
 École Nationale des Ponts et Chaussées (Ponts ParisTech)
 École nationale supérieure de génie industriel
 École Nationale Supérieure de Mécanique et d'Aérotechnique (ENSMA)
 École Nationale Supérieure des Mines de Douai
 École Nationale Supérieure des Mines de Nancy
 École Nationale Supérieure des Mines de Nantes
 École Nationale Supérieure des Mines de Paris (Mines ParisTech) 
 École Nationale Supérieure des Mines de Saint-Étienne
 École Nationale Supérieure des Techniques Avancées de Paris (ENSTA)
 École Nationale Supérieure des Télécommunications de Bretagne
 École Nationale Supérieure des Télécommunications de Paris
 École Nationale Supérieure d'Informatique et de Mathématiques Appliquées (ENSIMAG)
 École Polytechnique
 École Supérieure d'Électricité (Supélec)
 Institut National des Sciences Appliquées de Toulouse (INSA Toulouse)
 Institut Supérieur de l'aéronautique et de l'espace (ISAE-SUPAERO)

Germany
 Hochschule Hannover
 Hochschule Mannheim
 Technische Universität Berlin
 Technische Universität Darmstadt
 Technische Universität München
 Universität Stuttgart

Italy
 Politecnico di Milano
 Politecnico di Torino
 Università degli Studi di Trento
 Università degli Studi di Napoli Federico II

Belgium
 Faculté polytechnique de Mons
 UCLouvain
 University of Liège
 Gembloux Agro-Bio Tech
 Université libre de Bruxelles

Sweden
 Kungliga Tekniska Högskolan (KTH)
 Lunds Tekniska Högskola

Denmark
 Danmarks Tekniske Universitet

Czech Republic
 Czech University of Life Sciences Prague (FFWS)

United Kingdom
 Cranfield University
 North East Wales Institute of Higher Education (NEWI)

Austria
 Technische Universität Wien

United States
 Illinois Institute of Technology, Chicago

Argentina
 Universidad Nacional de la Patagonia Austral

Peru
 Pontificia Universidad Católica del Perú

Others
The UPM has Erasmus agreement with most of European engineering schools. Moreover, it has many other international agreements. Here a summary of the different international agreements.

 Erasmus Grants
 Athens Program
 Magalhães Program
 Erasmus Mundus Program
 MIT exchange.
 GE4 Program
 Spanish Chinese Exchange Program
 Spanish Indian Program
 Vulcanus Program
 Student Mobility with no Exchange Program
 EIT Digital Program

Notable alumni

Florentino Pérez, Real Madrid C.F. chairman and ACS CEO
Práxedes Mateo Sagasta, seven times Prime Minister of Spain
Francisco Álvarez Cascos, former Deputy Minister of Spain
Rafael Benítez, football manager
Josep Borrell, politician, President of the European Parliament and former minister
Leopoldo Calvo Sotelo,  former Prime Minister of Spain
Ángel Cabrera, president Georgia Institute of Technology 2019-, president George Mason University 2012-2019
Jaime Caruana, former Governor for the Bank of Spain from 2000 to 2006
Rafael del Pino, civil engineer, Founder and Former CEO of Ferrovial, 79th wealthiest man in the world according to Forbes
Pedro Duque, astronaut
Rafael Moneo, architect
Leonardo Torres y Quevedo, inventor (several engineering fields)
Antonio M. Pérez, CEO of Eastman Kodak
Juan Mata, attacking midfielder for English Premier League club Manchester United FC
Antonio Luque, engineer, photovoltaic solar energy pioneer

Image gallery

See also
 List of universities in Spain
 List of forestry universities and colleges
 List of test pilot schools
 Top Industrial Managers for Europe

References

External links

Official video channel

 
Educational institutions established in 1971
Public universities
Engineering universities and colleges in Spain
Forestry in Spain
1971 establishments in Spain